Gyula Márfi (born 17 December 1943) is a Hungarian prelate of the Catholic Church.

Pope John Paul II named him Archbishop of Veszprém in 1997.

Pope Francis accepted his resignation on 12 July 2019.

References

External links

Archdiocese of Veszprém

1943 births
Living people
People from Zala County
Archbishops of Veszprém